A850 may refer to:

Sony Alpha 850, Sony's second full-frame digital SLR, introduced on 27 August 2009
A850 road, one of the principal roads of the Isle of Skye in the Inner Hebrides off the west coast of mainland Scotland
Fujifilm FinePix A series - Fujifilm FinePix entry-level point and shoot models

See also